Fumble is a loss of ball possession in American football, and other ball sports.

Fumble may refer to:

American Football
The Fumble, a particularly notable fumble in 1987 AFC Championship Game between the Cleveland Browns and the Denver Broncos
Miracle at the Meadowlands, also known as "The Fumble", an incident in a 1978 New York Giants game

Music
 Fumble (band), a 1970s British rock group
 Fumble (album), a 1993 album by Scream